Galway North-East was a parliamentary constituency represented in Dáil Éireann, the lower house of the Irish parliament or Oireachtas from 1969 to 1977. The constituency elected 3 deputies (Teachtaí Dála, commonly known as TDs) to the Dáil, on the system of proportional representation by means of the single transferable vote (PR-STV).

History and boundaries 
The constituency was created under the Electoral (Amendment) Act 1969 for the 1969 general election to Dáil Éireann. It was abolished under the Electoral (Amendment) Act 1974, with effect from the 1977 general election.

Its boundaries were defined by the 1969 Act as:
the administrative county of Galway, except the parts thereof which were comprised in the constituencies of Clare–South Galway and Galway West;
part of County Roscommon, comprising all or part of the former rural districts of Athlone No. 2, Castlereagh and Roscommon.

TDs

Elections

1975 by-election 
Following the death of Fianna Fáil TD Michael F. Kitt, a by-election was held on 4 March 1975. The seat was won by the Fianna Fáil candidate Michael P. Kitt, son of the deceased TD.

1973 general election

1969 general election

See also 
Dáil constituencies
Politics of the Republic of Ireland
Historic Dáil constituencies
Elections in the Republic of Ireland

References

External links
 Oireachtas Members Database

Dáil constituencies in the Republic of Ireland (historic)
Historic constituencies in County Galway
1969 establishments in Ireland
1977 disestablishments in Ireland
Constituencies established in 1969
Constituencies disestablished in 1977